Terty Ivanovich Filippov (Те́ртий Ива́нович Фили́ппов; 5 January 1825 in Rzhev, Tver Governorate, Russian Empire – 12 December 1899 in Saint Petersburg, Russian Empire) was a Russian folklorist, singer, pedagogue, the Honorary member of the Saint Petersburg Academy of Sciences. As a journalist, Filippov contributed mostly to Pogodin's Moskvityanin, Katkov's Russky Vestnik and Russkaya Beseda, the magazine he was a co-founder of. In 1857–1864 Filippov served as a Russian Orthodox Church official. In 1889–1899 he was the Chairman of the Russian State Control committee. He was awarded Serbian Order of Saint Sava and Order of the Cross of Takovo.

References 

1825 births
1899 deaths
People from Rzhev
People from Rzhevsky Uyezd
Slavophiles
Russian folklorists
Russian theologians
19th-century Eastern Orthodox theologians
19th-century writers from the Russian Empire
19th-century historians from the Russian Empire
Honorary members of the Saint Petersburg Academy of Sciences
Recipients of the Order of St. Sava
Recipients of the Order of the Cross of Takovo
Burials at the Isidorovskaya Church of the Alexander Nevsky Lavra